Sir Edward Gurney Boyle, 1st Baronet KC (6 September 1848 – 19 March 1909) was a Conservative Party politician in the United Kingdom.

He was elected at the 1906 general election as Member of Parliament for Taunton, but died three years later, aged 60 a month after he had resigned his seat.

He had been made a baronet in 1904.

Early life
Boyle was born in Kensington, London on 6 September 1848 the son of Edward Boyle and Constance (née Knight). He first became architect and was a Fellow of the Surveyor's Institute. With a change of career he was called to the bar in 1887 as a barrister.  He later became a King's Counsel.

Politics
In 1900 he stood as a Conservative candidate for Hastings in the 1900 General Election, he lost to the liberal candidate. He stood again in 1903 in Rye at a by-election, he again lost to the Liberal candidate. In the 1906 General Election he stood as a candidate at Taunton where he was elected as the Member of Parliament for Taunton. He resigned his seat on 11 February 1909 due to ill health and was appointed a Steward of the Manor of Northstead.

Marriage & children
Boyle married Constance Jane Knight on 18 March 1874.  They had a son and daughter:

 Sir Edward Boyle, 2nd Baronet (born 12 June 1878, died 31 March 1945)
 Constance Beryl Bertha Boyle (born 31 March 1882, died 8 February 1965)

Boyle died on 19 March 1909 at his house at Queens Gate, Kensington, London aged 60.  He was succeeded in the baronetcy by his son.

Notes

References

External links 

1848 births
1909 deaths
Conservative Party (UK) MPs for English constituencies
Baronets in the Baronetage of the United Kingdom
UK MPs 1906–1910
English barristers
People from Kensington
British King's Counsel
19th-century English lawyers